Mansour Pourheidari (26 January 1946 – 4 November 2016) was an Iranian football player, coach and manager.

He started his football career at Daraei, before joining Taj (currently known as Esteghlal) in 1965. He played ten years for Taj; between 1965 and 1975. Pourheidari returned to Daraei in 1975 to play his final career's two years at the club. He also played for Iran albeit earning three caps only. After retiring from playing football, Pourheidari started his coaching career, becoming assistant manager of Esteghlal. He was promoted to the first team manager in 1983. He was the head coach of the club for 9 years overall, managing them in 309 games. He is also the only Iranian who has won AFC Champions League as both player and coach. He was the Head Coach of Iran national football team in 1998 Asian Games where they won the first place and gold medal. He died on 4 November 2016 of cancer. He was technical manager and a member of the board of directors of Esteghlal at the time of his death.

Playing careers
He began his football career at the age of 17 in Daraei but was transferred to Taj (now Esteghlal) in 1965 and played as a right defender for ten years and won the Asian Championship in 1970. He also played for Iran national football team and had 3 caps. He retired in 1977 from football.

Managerial careers
He began his managerial career in 1980 as assistant coach to Abbas Razavi and Asghar Sharafi. He was promoted as the club's head coach in 1983 after the resignation of Sharafi. After three years, he was resigned and becomes head coach of UAE Pro-League side, Al-Ahli and led the team until 1989. He was re-appointed as Esteghlal manager in 1989 and won the league in the following season. He also led Esteghlal to their second Asian trophy in 1991. He was left the team in the next year but was returned again as head coach in 1995 and led the team for one season. After that, he becomes head coach of Fajr Sepasi for two seasons but was unable to earn any trophy. He became head coach of Iran national football team in 1998 and led it until 2000. Pourheidari was also a member of the Board of directors of Esteghlal for decades. He was team manager of Esteghlal from 2010 to 2012 and from 2012, he was technical manager of the club.

Coaching career statistics

Honours

Playing honours

Iranian Football League (2): 1970–71, 1974–75
Asian Club Championship (1): 1970

Managerial honours

Esteghlal
Iranian Football League (2): 1989–90, 2000–01
Hazfi Cup (2): 1996, 2000
Asian Club Championship (1): 1991

Iran national team
Asian Games (1): 1998

Individual honours
January 1999 Asian Coach of the Month

Personal life
He was married to Farideh Shojaee, former Iran Football Federation vice president.

References

External links

1946 births
2016 deaths
Iranian footballers
Iranian football managers
Esteghlal F.C. players
Esteghlal F.C. managers
Iran national football team managers
People from Tehran
Iranian futsal coaches
Footballers at the 1970 Asian Games
Iran national futsal team managers
Association football defenders
Asian Games competitors for Iran
Sanat Naft Abadan F.C. managers
Persian Gulf Pro League managers